Sphaerium ovale is a freshwater bivalve of the family Sphaeriidae.

Description

Biology

Distribution and conservation status
 Not mentioned in IUCN Red List – Not Evaluated (NE) 
 Germany

References

ovale
Bivalves described in 1807